Hats Off EP was The Connells' first release, preceding Darker Days. It includes early versions of "If It Crumbles", which also appears on Boylan Heights, and "Hats Off" which would later be re-recorded for the band's debut album Darker Days.

Track listing
Side one
"Hats Off (Ten Gallon Remix)" – 4:04 

Side two
"Darker Days" – 3:10 
"If It Crumbles" – 3:32

Personnel 

Mike Connell – Guitar
David Connell – Bass
George Huntley  – Guitar, Keyboards, Vocals
Doug MacMillan – Vocals
Peele Wimberley – Drums 

The Connells albums
1985 debut EPs